Embolemus is a genus of wasps belonging to the family Embolemidae. There is debate regarding the status of the genus named Ampulicomorpha by Ashmead in 1893, generally considered now to be a junior synonym of Embolemus (e.g.,), as a few authorities dispute this (e.g.,).

The genus has cosmopolitan distribution.

Species

Extant

 Embolemus africanus (Risbec, 1957)
 Embolemus ambrensis Olmi, 2004
 Embolemus andersoni Olmi, 1998
 Embolemus angustipennis (Kieffer, 1912)
 Embolemus apertus Azevedo & Amarante, 2005
 Embolemus australis (Olmi, 1996)
 Embolemus bestelmeyeri Olmi, 1997
 Embolemus boraceia Amarante, Brandão & Carpenter, 1999
 Embolemus brandaoi Azevedo & Amarante, 2005
 Embolemus brothersi Olmi, 2006
 Embolemus burundensis Olmi, 2011
 Embolemus capensis Olmi, 1998
 Embolemus collinsi (Olmi, 1996)
 Embolemus confusus (Ashmead, 1893)
 Embolemus dayi (Guglielmino & Olmi, 2014)
 Embolemus fisheri Olmi, 2010
 Embolemus gabonensis Olmi, 2004
 Embolemus gilli (Olmi, 1998)
 Embolemus gressitti (Olmi, 1998)
 Embolemus hachijoensis Hirashima & Yamagishi, 1975
 Embolemus harteni Olmi, 1997
 Embolemus honshuensis Olmi, Mita & Guglielmino, 2014
 Embolemus huberi Olmi, 1997
 Embolemus irwini (Guglielmino & Olmi, 2014)
 Embolemus kheeli Olmi, 2004
 Embolemus krombeini Olmi, 1996
 Embolemus latus Azevedo & Amarante, 2005
 Embolemus magnus (Olmi, 1996)
 Embolemus nearcticus (Brues, 1922)
 Embolemus neotropicus Olmi, 1996
 Embolemus nepalensis (Olmi, 1998)
 Embolemus niger van Achterberg, 2000
 Embolemus notogeicus Olmi, 1996
 Embolemus ogloblini Olmi, 1998
 Embolemus olmii van Achterberg & van Kats, 2000
 Embolemus pecki Olmi, 1998
 Embolemus poirieri (Olmi, Capradossi & Guglielmino, 2019)
 Embolemus reticulatus van Achterberg, 2000
 Embolemus ruddii Westwood, 1833
 Embolemus sanbornei Olmi, 1997
 Embolemus schajovskoyi (De Santis & Vidal, 1977)
 Embolemus sensitivus Xu, Olmi & Guglielmino, 2012
 Embolemus stangei Olmi, 1996
 Embolemus suavis (Olmi, 1998)
 Embolemus subtilis Olmi, 1996
 Embolemus tauricus Olmi, Belokobylskij & Guglielmino, 2014
 Embolemus viator (Olmi, 2017)
 Embolemus villemantae Contarini, Olmi, Capradossi & Guglielmino, 2020
 Embolemus walkeri Richards, 1951
 Embolemus wilhelmensis Olmi, Marletta & Guglielmino, 2016
 Embolemus wilkersoni (Olmi, 1998)
 Embolemus zealandicus Olmi, 1966

Extinct
 †Embolemus antiquus Perkovsky et al., 2021 Burmese amber, Myanmar, Cenomanian
 †Embolemus brachypterus Olmi et al., 2021 Burmese amber, Myanmar, Cenomanian
 †Embolemus breviscapus (Brues, 1922) Baltic amber, Eocene
 †Embolemus burmensis Perkovsky et al., 2021 Burmese amber, Myanmar, Cenomanian
 †Embolemus cretacicus Perkovsky et al., 2021 Burmese amber, Myanmar, Cenomanian
 †Embolemus excitus Perrichot & Engel 2011 Baltic amber, Eocene
 †Embolemus janzeni (Olmi et al., 2014) Burmese amber, Myanmar, Cenomanian
 †Embolemus micropterus Olmi et al., 2021 Burmese amber, Myanmar, Cenomanian
 †Embolemus ohmkuhnlei Perkovsky et al., 2021 Burmese amber, Myanmar, Cenomanian
 †Embolemus perialla (Ortega-Blanco et al., 2011) Spanish amber, Albian
 †Embolemus quesnoyensis (Chény, Guillam, Nel & Perrichot, 2020) Oise amber, France, Ypresian
 †Embolemus succinalis (Brues, 1933) Baltic amber, Rovno amber, Eocene
 †Embolemus zherikhini Perkovsky et al., 2021 Burmese amber, Myanmar, Cenomanian

References

Chrysidoidea
Hymenoptera genera